The Blue Line is the term used in the U.S. state New York for the boundaries of the Adirondack and Catskill parks, within which can be found the state's Forest Preserve. The Constitution of New York requires that any property owned or acquired by the state in those parks "be forever kept as wild forest lands" and prohibits it from selling or transferring them in any way (save amending that section of the constitution to allow specific transactions).

It is so called because blue ink was used when the boundaries were first drawn on state maps. That started a tradition that persists to this day (although private mapmakers have just as often used green).

History

When the Forest Preserve was created in 1885, the legislature designated particular counties in the state as places where Forest Preserve could be acquired in the future. This definition was retained nine years later when the Forest Preserve Act became Article 14 of the state constitution.

Shortly afterwards, it became apparent that a more precise definition was needed, as some of the counties in which there was the greatest need to protect land also had large areas where that was not necessary. Ulster County, for instance, is home to some of the wildest land in the Catskills, but it also has many well-developed lowlands near the Hudson River.

In 1902, the legislature passed a bill defining the Adirondack Park for the first time in terms of the counties and towns within it.

Two years later, the Catskill Park followed suit. However, it was delineated not solely in terms of pre-existing political boundaries but instead through a combination of those and old survey lot lines, streams and railroad rights-of-way. That proved to be a more effective and politically viable method, and accordingly the Adirondack Park Blue Line was redrawn shortly afterwards following the Catskills' example.

Redefining the line

While it takes only a simple majority vote of the legislature to amend either Blue Line to add land to the park, any diminution requires that two successive legislative sessions approve, consistent with the process for amending the constitution without the public vote.

Both parks have grown considerably since being created. The Catskill Park reached its present size in the late 1950s; the Adirondack Park did not cover its current domain until the early 1970s.

Inside the Blue Line

In 1912 the legislature further clarified that the parks included the privately owned lands within as well as the public holdings. This has a few implications today.

Land use in the Adirondack Park is subject to the rules and zoning regulations of the sometimes-controversial Adirondack Park Agency (APA). Even the state Department of Environmental Conservation must get APA approval of its management plans for the Forest Preserve.

But there is no corresponding agency for the Catskills (largely due to the rough start experienced by the APA) and as a rule the practical impact of living within Blue Line is minor. Since the mid-1960s the state has regulated commercial highway signage within them in a manner similar to the federal Highway Beautification Act and tries to use a distinctive, rustic gold-on-brown color scheme for all its own signage within them.

The original Forest Preserve legislation assigned the state the primary role in controlling forest fires within the parks, a great relief to many towns within it then as steam locomotives and illegal logging were causing numerous remote fires. DEC still has that status in what the law calls "fire towns," which include every town entirely or partially within the parks (and the Ulster County town of Shawangunk, which has plenty of fire exposure on the eponymous ridge). Fires have become much less widespread than they used to be, however, thanks to a better-educated public and state oversight.

The Catskill Park is also the only place within the state's "Southern Zone" where hunters do not have to wear their deer tags in the woods.

Other state land use in the parks

Since Article 14 is interpreted as applying to all state land ownership or purchase within the parks, this creates some problems for other state agencies that need a physical presence within them to serve the public.

Usually the agencies involved, like the Department of Transportation, simply lease what they need from private landowners. Sometimes another governmental entity not subject to state law owns the land (the bistate Palisades Interstate Park Commission owns the future site of the Catskill Interpretive Center, and the Federal Bureau of Prisons lets the state lease land for its own prison near Ray Brook).

The Administrative Use land classification, particularly in the Adirondacks, also makes some other state business possible.

The law also exempts some areas within the park boundaries. Land inside the territory of any incorporated village or city does not have to be incorporated into the Forest Preserve. The towns of Altona and Dannemora are also excluded, despite being entirely or partially inside the Adirondack Blue Line, due to the large prison facilities located in them.

References

 NYS Adirondack Park Agency, History of the Adirondack Park, 2003, http://apa.ny.gov/about_park/history.htm (Retrieved 17-March-2009)

Geography of New York (state)
Adirondack Park
Catskill Park